Helsingborgs IF had the most successful international run for a Swedish club, beating Heerenveen and Galatasaray in the UEFA Cup, before losing to the season's Dutch champion, PSV Eindhoven in the last 32.

Squad

Goalkeepers
  Daniel Andersson
  Oscar Berglund

Defenders
  Andreas Landgren
  Andreas Jakobsson
  Leandro Castán
  Samir Beloufa
  Christoffer Andersson
  Erik Wahlstedt
  Oskar Rönningberg
  Joel Ekstrand

Midfielders
  Isaac Chansa
  Fredrik Svanbäck
  Andreas Dahl
  Marcus Lantz
  Ólafur Ingi Skúlason
  René Makondele
  Martin Kolář
  Babis Stefanidis
  Andreas Dahl
  Mathias Unkuri

Attackers
  Gustaf Andersson
  Razak Omotoyossi
  Henrik Larsson
  Fredrik Olsson
  Patrik Åström

Allsvenskan

Matches

Halmstad–Helsingborg 2–1
 0–1 Razak Omotoyossi 
 1–1 Tomas Žvirgždauskas 
 2–1 Emra Tahirović 
Helsingborg–Gefle 3–1
 1–0 Andreas Jakobsson 
 1–1 Yannick Bapupa 
 2–1 Daniel Bernhardsson 
 3–1 Henrik Larsson 
Djurgården–Helsingborg 3–1
 0–1 Andreas Jakobsson 
 1–1 Mattias Jonson 
 2–1 Mattias Jonson 
 3–1 Jones Kusi-Asare 
Helsingborg–Elfsborg 0–1
 0–1 Andreas Augustsson 
AIK–Helsingborg 0–1
 0–1 Razak Omotoyossi 
Helsingborg–Malmö FF 0–1
 0–1 Ola Toivonen 
Brommapojkarna–Helsingborg 1–1
 0–1 McDonald Mariga 
 1–1 Arash Talebinejad 
Helsingborg–Örebro 4–1
 0–1 Fredrik Nordback 
 1–1 Olivier Karekezi 
 2–1 Henrik Larsson 
 3–1 Babis Stefanidis 
 4–1 Razak Omotoyossi 
Kalmar FF–Helsingborg 2–0
 1–0 César Santín 
 2–0 César Santín 
Helsingborg–GAIS 1–1
 0–1 Eyjólfur Héðinsson 
 1–1 Babis Stefanidis 
Trelleborg–Helsingborg 2–3
 0–1 Razak Omotoyossi 
 0–2 Andreas Dahl 
 1–2 Erik Sundin 
 2–2 Erik Sundin 
 2–3 Andreas Jakobsson 
Helsingborg–Hammarby 4–2
 1–0 Samir Beloufa 
 2–0 Razak Omotoyossi 
 3–0 Henrik Larsson 
 3–1 Sebastián Castro Tello 
 3–2 Paulinho Guará 
 4–2 McDonald Mariga 
Helsingborg–IFK Göteborg 2–2
 0–1 Marcus Berg 
 0–2 Marcus Berg 
 1–2 Razak Omotoyossi 
 2–2 Razak Omotoyossi 
Helsingborg–AIK 2–3
 1–0 Henrik Larsson 
 1–1 Mauro Óbolo 
 1–2 Wílton Figueiredo 
 1–3 Lucas Valdemarín 
 2–3 Andreas Jakobsson 
Malmö FF–Helsingborg 1–1
 1–0 Júnior 
 1–1 Razak Omotoyossi 
GAIS–Helsingborg 0–3
 0–1 Andreas Landgren 
 0–2 Razak Omotoyossi 
 0–3 Olivier Karekezi 
Helsingborg–Kalmar FF 5–0
 1–0 Fredrik Svanbäck 
 2–0 Andreas Dahl 
 3–0 Henrik Larsson 
 4–0 Razak Omotoyossi 
 5–0 Henrik Larsson 
Elfsborg–Helsingborg 0–0
Helsingborg–Djurgården 1–4
 0–1 Thiago Quirino 
 0–2 Daniel Sjölund 
 0–3 Thiago Quirino 
 1–3 René Makondele 
 1–4 Mikael Dahlberg 
Helsingborg–Brommapojkarna 1–1
 1–0 Fredrik Svanbäck 
 1–1 Håkan Malmström 
Örebro–Helsingborg 4–3
 0–1 Razak Omotoyossi 
 0–2 Henrik Larsson 
 1–2 Sebastian Henriksson 
 2–2 Fredrik Nordback 
 3–2 Patrik Anttonen 
 4–2 Stefan Rodevåg 
 4–3 Henrik Larsson 
Helsingborg–Trelleborg 1–1
 1–0 Andreas Dahl 
 1–1 Michael Mensah 
Hammarby–Helsingborg 0–2
 0–1 Razak Omotoyossi 
 0–2 Razak Omotoyossi 
Gefle–Helsingborg 4–0
 1–0 Johan Oremo 
 2–0 Daniel Westlin 
 3–0 Johan Oremo 
 4–0 Jonas Lantto 
Helsingborg–Halmstad 9–0
 1–0 Christoffer Andersson 
 2–0 Andreas Jakobsson 
 3–0 René Makondele 
 4–0 Christoffer Andersson 
 5–0 Razak Omotoyossi 
 6–0 Henrik Larsson 
 7–0 Erik Wahlstedt 
 8–0 Andreas Landgren 
 9–0 René Makondele

Topscorers
  Razak Omotoyossi 14
  Henrik Larsson 9
  Andreas Jakobsson 5
  René Makondele 3

UEFA Cup

1st round

Helsingborg–Trans Narva 6–0
 1–0 Razak Omotoyossi 
 2–0 Andreas Dahl 
 3–0 Henrik Larsson 
 4–0 Henrik Larsson 
 5–0 Olivier Karekezi 
 6–0 Christoffer Andersson 
Trans Narva–Helsingborg 0–3
 0–1 Erik Wahlstedt 
 0–2 Fredrik Svanbäck 
 0–3 Mathias Unkuri

2nd round

Drogheda–Helsingborg 1–1
 0–1 Henrik Larsson 
 1–1 Eamon Zayed 
Helsingborg–Drogheda 3–0
 1–0 Andreas Jakobsson 
 2–0 Razak Omotoyossi 
 3–0 Olivier Karekezi

3rd round

Heerenveen–Helsingborg 5–3
 1–0 Michael Bradley 
 2–0 Gerald Sibon 
 3–0 Gerald Sibon 
 3–1 Henrik Larsson 
 3–2 Razak Omotoyossi 
 4–2 Kristian Bak Nielsen 
 5–2 Michael Bradley 
 5–3 Henrik Larsson 
Helsingborg–Heerenveen 5–1
 1–0 Henrik Larsson 
 2–0 Andreas Dahl 
 3–0 Razak Omotoyossi 
 4–0 René Makondele 
 5–0 Razak Omotoyossi 
 5–1 Gerald Sibon

Group stage

Helsingborg–Panionios 1–1
 0–1 Fanouris Goundoulakis 
 1–1 Henrik Larsson 
Galatasaray–Helsingborg 2–3
 0–1 Henrik Larsson 
 0–2 Razak Omotoyossi 
 1–2 Shabani Nonda 
 1–3 Christoffer Andersson 
 2–3 Shabani Nonda 
Helsingborg–Austria Wien 3–0
 1–0 Ólafur Ingi Skúlason 
 2–0 Razak Omotoyossi 
 3–0 Razak Omotoyossi 
Bordeaux–Helsingborg 2–1
 1–0 Marouane Chamakh 
 1–1 Henrik Larsson 
 2–1 Jussiê

Last 32

PSV Eindhoven–Helsingborg 2–0
 1–0 Timmy Simons 
 2–0 Danko Lazović 
Helsingborg–PSV Eindhoven 1–2
 0–1 Otman Bakkal 
 0–2 Danko Lazović 
 1–2 Leandro Castán 

Helsingborgs IF seasons
Helsingborg